Kensington bushland reserve is a significant remnant of Swan Coastal Plain vegetation, that has been reserved in the suburb of Kensington, in Perth, Western Australia, by the state government.

It is located west of Kent Street Senior High School, and lies on the north side of Kent Street.
The portion of Jarrah Road that defined the western boundary of the reserve is a cul de sac, known as Baron Hay Court. Across the road is a Department of Agriculture complex. It is close to the Western Australian Herbarium. In 2000 it was designated as  "Bush Forever Site 48" by the Government of Western Australia.

It was made a reserve in the 1990s when the suburb was still located within Perth City council boundaries. It is now within the Town of Victoria Park local government area, and is managed together with "The Kent Street Sand Pit" and the "George Street Reserve" (a contaminated landfill site) as a single entity, the "Jirdarup Bushland Precinct". This Precinct has a total area of 17.9 hectares. The name Jirdarup is a Nyoongar word meaning "place of birds". The Town of Victoria Park plans to rehabilitate the Sandpit site.

Description
It lies on the Bassendean Dune system, the oldest and most easterly of the sand dune systems of the Swan Coastal Plain.

Flora
Key upper storey plant species within the bushland are Banksia menziesii, Banksia attenuata and Jarrah (Eucalyptus marginata). As of 2003, some 207 plant species have been found, representing 42 families and 111 genera. Major weeds are Asparagus asparagoides, perennial veldt grass, Gladiolus caryophyllaceus, while Ehrharta longiflora, Ursinia anthemoides, and Misopates orontium are also threatening also to become a problem.

This bushland is part of the threatened ecological community (TEC), Banksia woodlands of the Swan Coastal Plain, the main threats to which are: fragmentation, dieback, weed invasion, inappropriate fire regimes and climate change. In February 2016, a bushfire burned approximately 70% of the native
vegetation of the reserve.

Fauna
Significant bird species which may be seen in the bushland are Carnaby's Black Cockatoo (Calyptorhynchus latirostris) - endangered, Forest Red-tailed Black Cockatoo (Calyptorhynchus banksii) - vulnerable, and the rainbow bee-eater (Merops ornatus), with Forest Redtailed Black-Cockatoo being year-round residents of the area.
Pitfall trapping in 2017 found eight native reptiles. These included the western bobtail (Tiliqua rugosa), dugites (Pseudonaja affinis), the western bearded dragon (Pogona minor), and Buchanan's snake-eyed skink (Cryptoblepharus buchananii).

This tiny piece of remnant bushland has often been the subject of surveys. Thus, one of the first Australian records for the aphid, Uroleucon erigeronense is from Kensington Bushland. The day-flying moth, Pollanisus occidentalis, is found in abundance in the bushland. A new species of robber fly, Cerdistus hudsoni, has so far (2011) only been found in two places, one of which is Kensington Bushland.

Galleries

References

External links

Eco Logical Australia, 2017. Kensington Bushland Management Plan. Prepared for Town of Victoria Park.’
SERS. 2016,Preliminary Environmental Site and Impact Assessment - Flora and Fauna: Harold Rossiter Park and Kensington Bushland
Facebook: Friends of Jirdarup Bushland

Kensington, Western Australia
Swan Coastal Plain 
Remnant urban bushland 
Nature reserves in Western Australia